Jack J. Morris (11 February 1878 – 1947) was an English footballer active at the turn of the 20th century. He made a total of 128 appearances in The Football League for Blackpool, Notts County and Bristol City.

References

1878 births
English Football League players
Notts County F.C. players
Blackpool F.C. players
Bristol City F.C. players
Gillingham F.C. players
Liverpool F.C. players
English footballers
1947 deaths
Association footballers not categorized by position